Ameco may refer to:

 Ameco Beijing, the Aircraft Maintenance and Engineering Corporation, a Chinese company
 Amusement Equipment Company, operator of Welsh Mumbles Pier and a manufacturer of Paratrooper fairground rides
 Annual macroeconomic database of the EU commission